Deniz Can Aktaş (born 28 July 1993) is a Turkish actor.

Life and career 
Aktaş was born in Istanbul. His family is originally from İnebolu . He's a graduate of Piri Reis University with a degree in Ship Machinery and Management Engineering. Aktaş started his career in 2015 with a role in the TV series Tatlı Küçük Yalancılar which adaptation of Pretty Little Liars. He played on youth series "Hayat Bazen Tatlıdır".

In 2017, he joined the cast of Star TV series Avlu (The Yard), acting alongside Demet Evgar. The series later became available for streaming on Netflix. His portrayal of the character Alp Öztürk in this series was well received by the critics. In 2019, he was cast in his first leading role in the series Aşk Ağlatır, which was broadcast on Show TV. In 2020, he starred in Menajerimi Ara, an adaptation of the French TV series Call My Agent!. In 2021, he had his first experience in theater where he played Romeo in a new adaptation of William Shakspeare's classical Romeo and Juliet. He played in medical series "Kasaba Doktoru".

Filmography

Theater

References

External links 
 
 

Living people
1992 births
Male actors from Istanbul
Turkish male television actors
People from İnebolu